Patan is one of the administrative blocks/Tehsil/ Taluka of Palamu district, Jharkhand state, India. According to census (2001), the block has 25,186 households with aggregate population of 146,139. The block has 186 villages.

History 

Patan a Taluka/Block, close to Medininager Palamu, is located 25 km from Medininagar (Daltonganj). Patan is a part of Chhatarpur (Jharkhand Assembly constituency). It is well connected by road via two road. Both Road connects to NH-139.

Old Patan Road is through patan mod Via Palhe and Main road passes through Bairiya chowk via Jonr. Patan surrounded on every side by mountains is a small beautiful town. It's well covered by Vodafone, Airtel, Uninor, Reliance, BSNL, Aircel, Idea, Airtel 3G, like cellular networks. ATM also available here for SBI near Patan Bazar.

Languages 

Languages spoken here include Asuri, an Austroasiatic language spoken by approximately 17 000 in India, largely in the southern part of Palamu; and Bhojpuri, a tongue in the Bihari language group with almost 40 000 000 speakers, written in both the Devanagari and Kaithi scripts.

See also
 Chhatarpur Assembly
 Palamu Loksabha constituency
 Jharkhand Legislative Assembly
 Jharkhand
 Palamu

References

External links 
 Blocks of Palamu district
 http://palamu.nic.in/patan.html

Community development blocks in Jharkhand
Community development blocks in Palamu district